The 2015–16 WKU Lady Toppers basketball team represents Western Kentucky University during the 2015–16 NCAA Division I women's basketball season. The Lady Toppers, led by third year head coach Michelle Clark-Heard. They play their home games at E. A. Diddle Arena and were second year members of Conference USA. They finished the season 27–7, 15–3 in C-USA play to finish in a tie for second place. They lost in the quarterfinals of the C-USA women's tournament to Marshall. They were invited to the Women's National Invitation Tournament where they defeated Dayton and Tennessee–Martin, Saint Louis in the first, second and third rounds before falling to South Dakota in the quarterfinals.

Roster

Schedule

|-
!colspan=9 style="background:#F5002F; color:#FFFFFF;"| Exhibition

|-
!colspan=9 style="background:#F5002F; color:#FFFFFF;"| Non-conference regular season

|-
!colspan=9 style="background:#F5002F; color:#FFFFFF;"| Conference USA regular season

|-
!colspan=9 style="background:#F5002F; color:#FFFFFF;"| Conference USA Women's Tournament

|-
!colspan=9 style="background:#F5002F; color:#FFFFFF;"| WNIT

Rankings

See also
2015–16 WKU Hilltoppers basketball team

References

Western Kentucky Lady Toppers basketball seasons
WKU
2016 Women's National Invitation Tournament participants
Western Ken
Western Ken